Inside Golf is an Australian-based golf publication covering golf news, stories, events and features for golf across Australia. Distributed free in pro shops, social clubs and retail outlets across Australia, the publication is Australia's highest-circulating (CAB Audited) golf publication, with a circulation of 42,614 copies per month.

History and profile
Inside Golf was established in 2005. The magazine is published by Outdoor Sports Publishing, a Gold Coast (Queensland) based publisher that also publishes Inside Golf Travel.

In 2010, 2011, 2012, 2013 and 2014, independent surveys by Golf Research Australia  and Sports Marketing Surveys concluded that Inside Golf is the most regularly read monthly golf publication in Australia, placing it above all other golf newsstand and subscription publications in the country.

Inside Golf website was started in 2006. The magazine is also available in digital form on iPads and iPhones

Team 
Publisher: Sam Arthur
Editor: Richard Fellner
Senior Writer: David Newbery

Location 
Main Office: Gold Coast, Queensland.

References

External links 
Inside Golf website

Monthly magazines published in Australia
Sports magazines published in Australia
Golf magazines
Magazines established in 2005
2005 establishments in Australia